Paor may refer to:

People
 Enrico Paor (1896–1982), Italian cross country skier
 Ilio Paor (1931–1953), Italian cross country skier
 Louis de Paor (born 1961), Irish poet
 Máire de Paor (1925–1994), Irish historian and archaeologist
 Seán Óg De Paor (born 1970), Irish football player
 Vincenzo Paor (1899–1961), Italian cross country skier

Places
 Northway Airport, Alaska (by ICAO code)